The 2009 Laval municipal election took place on November 1, 2009, to elect a mayor and city councillors in Laval, Quebec.

Gilles Vaillancourt was elected to a sixth term as mayor, and his municipal party won every seat on city council.

Results

Source: Résultants 2009; Élections municipales 2009; Affairs municipales, Régions et Occupation du territoire, Government of Quebec.

References

2009 Quebec municipal elections
2009